Estádio Municipal Maria Tereza Breda is a stadium in Olímpia, Brazil. It has a capacity of 15,022 spectators.  It is the home of Olímpia Futebol Clube.

References

Mun